Il Teatro degli Orrori was an Italian noise rock band from Venice.

The band's name (Theater of Horrors) is inspired by the Theatre of Cruelty of Antonin Artaud.

Biography 
The group formed in the winter of 2005. The line-up consisted of Pierpaolo Capovilla (frontman of One Dimensional Man (band)), Francesco Valente (One Dimensional Man (band) post Dario Perissutti) and Jonathan Mirai (voice and guitar of Super Elastic Bubble Plastic). They were later joined by Giulio Favero (formerly One Dimensional Man (band)), thus completing the line-up.
On 6 April 2007 their first album, called Dell'Impero delle Tenebre, was released. On 20 June 2008 the band attended the Heineken Jammin 'Festival supporting Linea 77.

On 25 March 2009, the compilation Afterhours presentano: Il paese è reale (19 artisti per un paese migliore?) was released, an idea of Manuel Agnelli of Afterhours following the group's participation at the Sanremo Festival in 2009, to support and promote indie rock from the Italian underground scene. Il Teatro degli Orrori featured on the compilation with a song called Refusenik, inspired by the events of Israeli conscientious objectors who refuse to take up arms in protest against the occupation of the Palestinian territories.

Two years after the release of Dell'Impero delle Tenebre, in 2009 the band released the album A Sangue Freddo for La Tempesta Records. The title song of the album is dedicated to Ken Saro-Wiwa, a Nigerian poet who was killed in 1995. The album was well received by critics and described as "less crude and immediate" than the previous work. In early 2010 Giulio Favero left the band, while multi-instrumentalist Bologna Violenta (guitar, violin, synth) and Tommaso Mantelli on bass both joined.

In June the band took the stage at the MTV Day 2010. In March 2011, on his Facebook page, Capovilla announced the departure of drummer Francesco Valente and the sacking of guitarist Bologna Violenta and bassist Mantelli. No info is given about replacements, except for the return to bass by Giulio Favero.
22 July 2011 Giulio Favero announced on Facebook that the band was to start the recording of their third album with their original line-up. On 25 November 2011 the band announced the release of Il Mondo Nuovo scheduled for 31 January 2012. The album consists of 16 tracks, for a total duration of almost 70 minutes; In March 2012, the group went on tour to promote the album.

Band members 
 Pierpaolo Capovilla – voice (since 2005)
 Gionata Mirai – guitar (since 2005)
 Giulio Ragno Favero – Bass (2005–2010 and since 2011)
 Francesco Valente – Drums (since 2005)

Ex-members
 Tommaso Mantelli – Bass (2010–2011)
 Bologna Violenta – Guitar (2010–2011)

Discography

Studio albums
 2007 – Dell'Impero delle Tenebre (La Tempesta)
 2009 – A Sangue Freddo (La Tempesta)
 2012 – Il Mondo Nuovo (La Tempesta)
 2015 – Il Teatro degli Orrori (La Tempesta)

EP
 2008 – Il Teatro degli Orrori/Zu (La Tempesta)
 2010 – Raro EP (XL Repubblica)

Live album
 2012 – Dal Vivo (XL Repubblica)

Compilation
 2009 – Afterhours presentano: Il paese è reale (19 artisti per un paese migliore?)

Videoclip and Singles
 Compagna Teresa (2007)
 La Canzone di Tom (2008)
 Carrarmatorock! (2008)
 A Sangue Freddo (2009)
 Direzioni Diverse (2010)
 E' Colpa Mia (2010)
 Io Cerco Te (2012)
 Non Vedo l'Ora (2012)
 Cuore d'oceano (2012)
 La Paura (2015)

References

Italian noise rock groups
Italian rock music groups
Musicians from Venice
2005 establishments in Italy
Musical groups established in 2005